The Pavilion du Butard is a hunting lodge in the Forêt de Fausses-Reposes in the territory of La Celle-Saint-Cloud in Yvelines, France. Part of the gardens of Versailles, it was designed by Ange-Jacques Gabriel for Louis XV and built between 1750 and 1754. It was made state property on 27 June 1794 by François-Nicolas Périgon, notary at Paris, during the French Revolution. On 23 April 1802 it became the property of empress Joséphine de Beauharnais, who wished to merge it with her Malmaison estate, but it returned to being state property on her divorce from Napoleon in 1809. It was later also enjoyed by Charles X of France and emperor Napoleon III of France. It was occupied by the Prussians during the Franco-Prussian War. Still state property, it was made a monument historique on 29 August 1927. In 2019, the pavilion is the subject of interest from the Centre des Monuments Nationaux, with a view to a hypothetical purchase.

Sources
Detailed history of the Pavillon du Butard by Ed Christen – on Gallica
Philippe Loiseleur des Longchamps Deville, La Celle Saint-Cloud, cellule d'histoire, Pontoise, Graphédis, 1979

References

Monuments historiques of Île-de-France
Houses completed in 1754
1754 establishments in France